Gabbiella is an East African genus of small freshwater snails with an operculum, aquatic prosobranch gastropod mollusks in the family Bithyniidae.

Species 

Species in the genus Gabbiella include:

 Gabbiella balovalensis
 Gabbiella humerosa
 Gabbiella rosea
 Gabbiella stanleyi

References 

Bithyniidae
Taxonomy articles created by Polbot